Iberia de Veracruz was a former Mexican football team that played in the Liga Amateur de Veracruz prior to the professionalization and development of the Mexican first division. The club was established in 1915 and was dissolved in 1943.

Liga Amateur de Veracruz
Iberia de Córdoba played in the Liga Amateur de Veracruz and became champions in the 1917–18 season. In 1918, after winning the title, the club was invited to play in the Primera Fuerza by Club España to replace España B. Before the start of the 1918–19 season the club decided to switch their name to España Veracruz.

Primera Fuerza

1918–19

España Veracruz began playing in Primera Fuerza in the 1918–19 not faring well with the Mexico City teams. They ended last place in that season

1919–20

Again as the previous season España Veracruz failed to improve ending in last place.

Return to Liga Amateur de Veracruz
After 2 bad seasons winning only 5 games out of 28 games played, the club return to play in the Liga Sur for the 1920–21 season in Veracruz after the Primera Fuerza decides that only clubs from the capital would be allowed to participate in the league. The club returns to a league dominated by Veracruz Sporting Club, who would dominate the league in the 20s and 30s after the club had its chance to play in the Primera Fuerza in Mexico City.

Iberia de Veracruz was able to win a few more titles until the Liga Amateur de Veracruz was dissolved in 1943 in order to begin the first professional league in Mexico, Pimera Division de Mexico.

Honours
Liga Amateur de Veracruz:
 Winners (5): 1917–18, 1923–24, 1935–36, 1938,39, 1941–42

References

See also
Football in Mexico

Defunct football clubs in Veracruz
Association football clubs established in 1915
1915 establishments in Mexico
1943 disestablishments in Mexico
Association football clubs disestablished in 1943
Primera Fuerza teams